The African Paralympic Committee (APC) or the African Sports Confederation of physically challenged persons (ASCOD) is an organization based in Luanda, Angola. Its African membership is 48 National Paralympic Committees.

Member countries 
In the following table, the year in which the NPC was recognized by the International Paralympic Committee (IPC) is also given if it is different from the year in which the NPC was created.

See also
 Association of National Olympic Committees of Africa

References

Paralympic Committees
African Paralympic Committee